Diborane(4) is a transient inorganic compound with the chemical formula . Stable derivatives are known. 

Diborane(4) has been produced by abstraction of two hydrogen atoms from diborane(6) using atomic fluorine and detected by photoionization mass spectrometry. Computational studies predict a structure in which are two hydrogen atoms bridging the two boron atoms via three-centre two-electron bonds in addition to the 2-centre, 2-electron bond between the two boron atoms and one terminal hydrogen atom bonded to each boron atom.

Several stable derivatives of diborane(4) have been reported.

References 

Boranes